The Laboratory for Laser Energetics (LLE) is a scientific research facility which is part of the University of Rochester's south campus, located in Brighton, New York. The lab was established in 1970 and its operations since then have been funded jointly; mainly by the United States Department of Energy, the University of Rochester and the New York State government. The Laser Lab was commissioned to serve as a center for investigations of high-energy physics, specifically those involving the interaction of extremely intense laser radiation with matter. Many types of scientific experiments are performed at the facility with a strong emphasis on inertial confinement, direct drive, laser-induced fusion, fundamental plasma physics and astrophysics using the Omega Laser Facility. In June 1995, OMEGA became the world's highest-energy ultraviolet laser. The lab shares its building with the Center for Optoelectronics and Imaging and the Center for Optics Manufacturing. The Robert L. Sproull Center for Ultra High Intensity Laser Research was opened in 2005 and houses the OMEGA EP laser, which was completed in May 2008.

The laboratory is unique in conducting big science on a university campus. More than 180 Ph.D.s have been awarded for research done at the LLE. During summer months the lab sponsors a program for high school students which involves local-area high school juniors in the research being done at the laboratory. Most of the projects are done on current research that is led by senior scientists at the lab.

History
The LLE was founded on the University of Rochester's campus in 1970, by Dr. Moshe Lubin. Working with outside companies such as Kodak the team built Delta, a four beam laser system in 1972. Construction started on the current LLE site in 1976. The facility opened a six beam laser system in 1978 and followed with a 24 beam system two years later. In 2018, Donna Strickland and Gérard Mourou shared a Nobel prize for work they had undertaken in 1985 while at LLE. They invented a method to amplify laser pulses by "chirping" for which they would share the 2018 Nobel Prize in Physics. This method disperses a short, broadband pulse of laser light into a temporally longer spectrum of wavelengths. The system amplifies the laser at each wavelength and then reconstitutes the beam into one color. Chirp pulsed amplification became instrumental in building the National Ignition Facility and the Omega EP system. In 1995, the omega laser system was increased to 60 beams, and in 2008 the Omega extended performance system was opened.

The Guardian and Scientific American provided simplified summaries of the work of Strickland and Mourou: it "paved the way for the shortest, most intense laser beams ever created". "The ultrabrief, ultrasharp beams can be used to make extremely precise cuts so their technique is now used in laser machining and enables doctors to perform millions of corrective" laser eye surgeries.

OMEGA laser

The OMEGA laser at the LLE is one of the most powerful and highest energy lasers in the world. It is a 60-beam ultraviolet frequency-tripled neodymium glass laser, which is capable of delivering 40 kilojoules at up to 60 terawatts onto a target less than 1 millimeter in diameter. Construction and commissioning of the laser were completed in 1995. OMEGA held the record for highest energy laser (per pulse) from 1999 (after the Nova laser's dismantling) to 2005, when the first 8 beams of the National Ignition Facility exceeded OMEGA's output by about 30 kJ in the ultraviolet. The maximum fusion yield of OMEGA so far is about 1014 neutrons per shot, and it once held the record for highest neutron yield of any inertial confinement fusion device. It has demonstrated at least 5e13 neutrons per shot.

OMEGA EP laser

The four beam OMEGA EP (extended performance) laser system was dedicated on May 16, 2008. Along with four NIF-like laser beams, it hosts a new target chamber and a vacuum pulse compression chamber containing large-aperture pulse compression gratings, allowing the laser system to perform short pulse laser shots. The laser is housed inside a 2005 building addition. The combination of the OMEGA and the OMEGA EP laser systems make LLE the world's only fully integrated cryogenic fast ignition experimental facility.

Organization 

LLE is located on and operated by the University of Rochester. Omega and Omega EP are user facilities, open for use by the entire scientific community.

LLE's principal sponsor is the Department of Energy/National Nuclear Security Administration (DOE/NNSA) Office of Defense Programs, which supports its stockpile stewardship and advanced scientific computing programs.

The Laboratory has a five-fold mission:
 To conduct implosion experiments and basic physics experiments in support of the National Inertial Confinement Fusion (ICF) program.
 To develop new laser and materials technologies.
 To provide graduate and undergraduate education in electro-optics, high-power lasers, high-energy-density physics, plasma physics, and nuclear fusion technology.
 To operate the National Laser Users' Facility.
 To conduct research and development in advanced technology related to high-energy-density phenomena.

See also 
 HiPER
 Inertial confinement fusion
 University of Rochester
 Riccardo Betti
 Gérard Mourou
 Big Science

References

External links

 Official website
 Center for Optics Manufacturing
 OMEGA
 OMEGA EP
 Omega Laser Facility Users' Group This users’ guide was created to help users of the Omega Laser Facility propose and carry out experiments at the facility. It has extensive technical details on the facility.
 R. Stephen Craxton

University of Rochester
Inertial confinement fusion research lasers
1970 establishments in New York (state)
University and college laboratories in the United States